Abadehella is a genus of large Upper Permian benthic forams in the order Fusulinida. It is the sole known genus of the family Abadahellidae, for which the diagnosis is the same. Abadahellidae was established by Loeblich and Tappan 1984; Abadahella by  Okimura and Ishi, 1975.

The genus extends across the lowermost member of the Zewan Formation in Kashmir, the Palaeofusulina limestone in Malaysia, the Lepidolina multiseptata limestone in Cambodia and the Lepodlina mustipetata and  Lepidolina kumaensis Zones in Japan.

Physiology
Their outer test is conical, up to 1.35mm at the concave base, coiled trochospirally with up to twenty whorls, each with one and a half to two low chambers surrounding the open umbilicus. Chambers are subdivided by close, evenly spaced radial beams. The test wall is calcareous and two-layered, with an external wall with an outer dark microgranular layer and an inner light fibrous layer, septa and beams with a single micro-granular layer. The aperture from each chamber opens into the umbilical region beneath a short  projection.

See also
 List of prehistoric foraminiferans
 Classification of Genus: Abadehella.  Global Biodiversity Information Facility Jan 12, 2011

References

 Loeblich A.R. jr, & H Tappan, 1988. Forminiferal Genera and their classification. (e-book). 
 Sen Gupta, B.K. 2002. Modern Foraminifera. 
 Kyōto Teikoku Daigaku. Rigakubu 1978. 
Memoirs of the Faculty of Science, Kyoto University: Series of geology and mineralogy, Volumes 45-48.  Jan 12,2011
 Kyōto Daigaku. Rigakubu, Memoirs of the Faculty of Science, Kyoto University: Series of geology and mineralogy, Volumes 40-41. Jan 12, 2011

Foraminifera genera